Hoseynabad-e Humeh or Hosein Abad Hoomeh or Hosain Abad Hoomeh may refer to:
 Hoseynabad-e Humeh, Fars
 Hoseynabad-e Olya, Anbarabad, Kerman Province
 Hoseynabad-e Zinabad, Kerman Province